A banana fritter is a fritter made by deep frying battered banana or plantain in hot oil. It is a common dish across Southeast Asia and South India.

Varieties

Brunei  
Banana fritters are a traditional snack in Brunei, where they are called . They are similar to pisang goreng in Indonesia and Malaysia. , a variant of  made with honey, are popular as a light afternoon meal.

Cambodia

In Khmer, banana fritters are called num chek chien. They are made by dipping flattened bananas in a thick mixture of rice flour, sesame seeds, egg whites and coconut milk seasoned with salt and sugar and deep frying them in hot oil until crispy and golden. The Cambodian banana fritters are more savoury than sweet and are often eaten as a snack with coconut ice cream as a popular accompaniment. A famous banana fritter shop in Cambodia is Chek Chean Pises operating since 2000 that has two locations in Phnom Penh – at Mao Tse Tong Boulevard and Kampuchea Krom Boulevard.

India

South India

Vazhakkappam or pazham pori, also known as ethakka appam, "boli", and bekachi is a fritter food with ripened banana or plantain and maida flour. A popular food item in South Indian cuisines, especially in Kerala, it is generally eaten as a breakfast or a snack. It is called as balekayi bajji in Kannada, vazhakkay bajji in Tamil, and aratikaya bajji in Telugu.

Pazham pori is principally made from bananas or plantain. Plantains are slit lengthwise after peeling and is dipped into a batter made from all-purpose flour, salt, turmeric powder and sugar. This is then deep fried in oil until golden brown. In the other South Indian states of Karnataka and Tamil Nadu, it is however prepared using besan flour.

Pazham pori is served usually along with tea or chai as a snack in the evening. In some restaurants pazham pori is served along with beef.

Indonesia 

In Indonesia, banana fritters are commonly known as pisang goreng. They are often sold by street vendors, In Indonesia pisang goreng are deep fried in ample of cooking oil; they might be coated with batter or not.

Plantain is often used instead of banana. Traditionally, some cultivars of banana such as pisang raja, pisang tanduk and pisang kepok are the most popular kinds of banana used for pisang goreng. These banana cultivars have a mild sweet and sour flavor and firm texture that will not crumble upon being fried. Pisang raja however, has a softer texture and a fragrant aroma. The banana is often battered and then deep fried in ample palm oil. Pisang goreng might be battered or plain deep fried. The batter most commonly uses a combination of flour, either wheat, rice flour, tapioca or bread crumb. Several recipes might add coconut milk or milk and vanilla extract into the batter to add aroma.
Most traditional street vendors will then sell them as is, without any additional ingredients or toppings. However, more upscale coffee shops, cafes and restaurants serve more sophisticated pisang goreng sprinkled with powdered sugar, cinnamon sugar, cheese, jam, condensed milk, chocolate or vanilla ice cream.

In Indonesia, it is consumed as a snack to accompany tea or coffee, either in the morning or late afternoon break. Traditional warung kopi (local coffee shops) often offer pisang goreng and other snacks, including fritters and kue to accompany coffee or tea.

Banana fritters along other kinds of fritters are sold on travelling carts or by street vendors throughout Indonesia. Other than pisang goreng, various kinds of ingredients are battered and deep fried such as tempeh, mendoan, tofu (tahu goreng), oncom, sweet potato, cassava chunk, cassava tapai, tapioca (cireng), vegetables (bakwan) and breadfruit.

Every regions in Indonesia has developed various recipe for pisang goreng with a variety of different names, ingredients and cooking techniques.  In Bali for example, pisang goreng is called godoh biu, in West Java it is called cau goreng, in Java gedhang goreng, in Sibolga pisang rakit and in Pontianak pisang kipas.

Pisang goreng is usually sold together with other gorengan fritters including fried tofu and tempeh. However, Pisang goreng Pontianak are widely popular in Indonesia with certain retail outlets exclusively selling only this type of banana fritters.

Pisang goreng variants 

Indonesia has many varieties of pisang goreng, including:
Pisang goreng kipas or Pisang goreng Pontianak Refers to banana cut in the shape of a fan, battered, and deep fried. The term pisang goreng Pontianak is often used interchangeably with pisang goreng kipas, as both have a similar fan-like shape, but the former is often filled or served with kaya jam.

Pisang goreng pasir Literally meaning "sandy fried banana", bread crumbs are added to the batter, resulting in grainy, crispy crumbs on the skin, making it have a similar texture to croquette.

Pisang goreng kremes Javanese pisang goreng kremes is quite similar to pisang goreng pasir, but with a different batter composition and a different frying technique. The batter coating is made of rice flour, vanilla extract, and coconut milk, deep fried in an ample of hot cooking oil, creating crispy and crunchy kremes granules in the coating, and resulting in a sweet, fragrant aroma.

Pisang goreng madu Literally meaning "honey fried banana", honey is added into the batter, and prior to serving honey is drizzled upon the fried banana. The color is rather dark due to the caramelised honey.

Pisang molen Derived from Dutch influence in Indonesia, pisang molen literally means "milled banana". Unlike other batter-coated pisang goreng, pisang molen is wrapped around in tape-shaped thin pastry dough prior to frying, creating a crunchy texture on the outside similar to pastry skin, while the banana inside remains moist and soft.

Pisang cokelat Often colloquially abbreviated as piscok, it is a thin crepe skin filled with banana and chocolate sprinkles or chocolate condensed milk, folded and deep fried in a similar fashion to making spring rolls. It is almost identical to the Filipino turon.

Pisang embal Kei pisang goreng is similar to other batter-coated pisang goreng, but using embal (tapioca or cassava starch) in its batter. It served with sambal.

Pisang nugget Small nugget-shaped fried banana. Its texture is akin to pisang goreng pasir in that it is coated in bread crumbs, however it is much smaller in size, similar in shape to chicken nuggets.

Pisang goreng telanjang Literally meaning "naked fried banana", it is fried without any batter. Salted butter or margarine are added, and it may be topped with grated cheddar cheese. Pisang raja and pisang tanduk are the most suitable banana cultivars to be fried without batter.

Pisang goreng Manado Manado pisang goreng is similar to other batter-coated pisang goreng, except it is served with sambal roa, a spicy chili paste made of smoked roa fish and fresh chilies.

Malaysia 

In Malaysia banana fritters are commonly known as pisang goreng  in Malay language. The style of banana fritters commonly found in Malaysia is made by deep frying battered plantain in hot oil. It is typically consumed as a snack in the morning and afternoon. They are often sold by street vendors, although it is also offered as a product at storefronts and dining establishments

Philippines

There are numerous fried banana dishes in Philippines. They are almost always made from saba bananas, a native cooking banana that is widely used in Filipino cuisine. Pritong saging are fried saba bananas (without batter) usually served with sugar or syrup. Bananas cooked with batter are a different dish known as maruya, which are more commonly made mashed or sliced very thinly and spread into a fan shape. However, the most common Filipino street food dishes made from banana are banana cue and turon. Banana cue are fried bananas coated with caramelized sugar and served on skewers; while turon is a type of fried dessert lumpia unique to the Philippines and is cooked in a crepe wrapper.

Thailand

Kluai khaek, sometimes called kluai thot, is a popular Thai street snack. Kluai khaek is made from fried, floured banana commonly topped with white sesame.

For the word kluai in Thai means "banana" and khaek literally means "guest" and is a colloquialism used for Indians, Muslims or Hindus. Assumed that the reason it was called, probably because it was adapted from the recipe of those people.

At present, it can be considered as street food that is easily found in general street stalls. Often sold with other types of snacks that have similar characteristics, such as khanom khai nok kratha, khao mao thot, fried taro, etc.

An area famous for kluai khaek in Bangkok is Nang Loeng, Pom Prap Sattru Phai District. Here, there are many kluai khaek shops. The sellers will dress with aprons different colours vary according to each shop. They will carry banana bag, walk down the street and sell to those who drive through the streets and intersections in this area. In February 2018, Bangkok Metropolitan Administration (BMA) has banned this type of trade.

Suriname
In Suriname, this snack is also known as bakabana (meaning baked banana in Surinamese).

Vietnam

In Vietnamese, banana fritters are called chuối chiên. They are based on the French dessert banana flambée. After deep frying, Vietnamese banana fritters are drizzled with rum or rice wine and ignited to further crisp them.

See also

 Banana cue, Filipino version of fried bananas
 Fried plantain, African version of fried bananas
 List of banana dishes
Banana chips

References

South Indian cuisine
Kerala cuisine
Indo-Caribbean cuisine
Plantain dishes
Banana dishes
Cambodian cuisine
Indonesian snack foods
Malaysian snack foods
Bruneian cuisine
Philippine cuisine
Singaporean cuisine
Vietnamese cuisine
Desserts
Malay cuisine
Malay words and phrases
Vegetarian dishes of Indonesia
Street food in Indonesia
Burmese cuisine
Fritters
Indian snack foods
Vegetarian dishes of India
Street food in India